Vahey is a surname. Notable people with this surname include:

Cristin McCarthy Vahey, American politician
James H. Vahey (1871–1929), American lawyer and politician
James H. Vahey Jr. (1900–1949), American lawyer and political figure
John Haslette Vahey (1881–1938), Northern Irish author of detective fiction
Robert Vahey (1932–2013), British actor
William Vahey (1949–2014), American schoolteacher and child molester